10 Peach is an Australian free-to-air television channel operated by Network 10. It was launched on 11 January 2011 as Eleven. It is owned by ElevenCo, which was established as a joint venture between Ten Network Holdings and CBS Studios International; the latter would ultimately acquire Network 10 in 2017.

The channel focuses primarily on programming targeting a young adult audience, and was the current home of Neighbours—the longest-running drama series on Australian television. Prior to the launch of 10 Shake in September 2020, the channel also aired children's programming.

History 
Prior to the launch of the channel, Ten Network Holdings, at the time an independent company, established a joint venture company named ElevenCo with international distributor CBS Studios International. Ten held a two-thirds equity stake in the venture, with CBS holding the remaining share. Under the arrangement, Eleven gained access to programming from CBS's back catalogue. Ten Network Holdings entered administration in 2017 and was subsequently acquired by CBS Corporation, ultimately giving CBS full ownership of Eleven. CBS ultimately merged with Viacom, making 10 Peach a sister network to MTV and Nickelodeon.

10 Peach
On 31 October 2018, the channel rebranded as 10 Peach, as part of a larger rebranding of Network Ten. The new name is intended to provide a clearer scope for the channel's programming; Network 10's chief content officer Beverley McGarvey described "Peach" as feeling "relaxed" and "almost a guilty pleasure" to viewers, with programmes such as Neighbours, Supernatural, This Is Us, and Will & Grace, and would attempt to represent all that the peach fruit itself stood for.

Programming
10 Peach offers catch-up and encore presentations from Channel 10. It features a mix of repeated classic programs, new shows to Australian television, and shows that would make their debut on Australian free-to-air television.

Most of the classic programming on 10 Peach comprises 80's, 90's and 2000's comedies and dramas sourced from Paramount Television, CBS Studios and CBS Studios International (via parent company Paramount Global).

Some of Ten's shows aimed at a younger demographic, most notably Neighbours, were moved to Eleven for the launch of the new channel. This was part of Ten's re-branding to target the older demographic. The decision to move Neighbours and other shows was to also make way for a new current affairs show in Ten's 6:00–7:00pm timeslot. In 2015 Neighbours was Eleven's highest-rating program and the number-one regular Australian program on the digital multichannels, averaging 278,000 viewers.

On 27 February 2012, Toasted TV was moved from Ten to Eleven due to a number of changes to their morning line-up, which included the launch of Breakfast. On 4 November 2013, more of Ten's shows including Totally Wild, Scope, Wurrawhy and Mako: Island of Secrets moved due to the launch of Wake Up and Studio 10. Other first-run Australian content on 10 Peach includes Couch Time, The Loop and Bondi Ink Tattoo.

On 6 April 2020, a six-hour programming block of Nickelodeon children's content was added to the network, which aired under the Toasted TV branding. This ran until 27 September, when children's programming was entirely moved to 10 Shake. Toasted TV was cancelled, with its final episode airing on 18 September.

Current programming

Comedy

 Becker
 The Big Bang Theory
 Frasier
 Friends
 The King of Queens
 The Middle
 Mom
 The Neighborhood
 Seinfeld
 Two and a Half Men

Drama

 Nancy Drew

Light entertainment

 The Late Late Show with James Corden
 The Late Show with Stephen Colbert

Reality
 The Real Love Boat

Sport
 National Basketball League (Two Sunday afternoon games per round)

Former programming

Adult animation

 The Cleveland Show
 Bob's Burgers
 Bordertown
 Duckman
 Futurama (moved to 7flix)
 King of the Hill
 Pacific Heat
 The Simpsons (moved to 7mate,  7flix and Disney+)
 Son of Zorn
 Unsupervised

Children's (2012–20)

 The Adventures of Chuck and Friends
 The Amazing Spiez!
 B-Daman Crossfire
 Baby Animals in Our World (2016–18)
 Bakugan
 Barbie: Life in the Dreamhouse
 The Barefoot Bandits (2016–20)
 Beyblade (Now on 9Go!)
 Beyblade Metal Fury
 Beyblade: Metal Fusion
 Beyblade: Metal Masters
 Beyblade: Shogun Steel
 BeyWarriors: BeyRaiderz
 BeyWheelz
 Blazing Team: Masters of Yo-Kwon-Do
 The Bureau of Magical Things (2018–20)
 Cardfight!! Vanguard (2018 series)
 Cardfight!! Vanguard G
 Cardfight!! Vanguard G: GIRS Crisis
 Cardfight!! Vanguard G: NEXT
 Cardfight!! Vanguard G: Stride Gate
 Chaotic
 Clue
 Dex Hamilton: Alien Entomologist
 Dinofroz
 Dinosaur King
 Drakers
 The Elephant Princess (2014)
 Eon Kid
 The Fairly OddParents (moved to ABC ME)
 Gamify (2019–20)
 Get Ace (2014–18)
 Geronimo Stilton
 GGO Football
 GoGoRiki
 Gormiti: The Lords of Nature Return
 Gormiti Nature Unleashed
 H2O: Just Add Water (2013–14)
 Hanazuki: Full of Treasures
 Hero: 108
 Hot Wheels Battle Force 5
 Huntik: Secrets & Seekers
 iCarly (2012–16, moved to 10 Shake)
 Jar Dwellers SOS (2013–20)
 Julius Jr.
 Kuu Kuu Harajuku (2015–20)
 Lalaloopsy
 Lexi & Lottie: Trusty Twin Detectives (2016–18)
 Lightning Point (2014)
 Mako: Island of Secrets (2013–18)
 Matt Hatter Chronicles
 Me and My Monsters (2014)
 Monster High
 My Little Pony: Friendship Is Magic (moved to 9Go!)
 Pac-Man and the Ghostly Adventures
 Paradise Café
 Pearlie
 The Penguins of Madagascar (moved to ABC ME)
 Pokémon (moved to 9Go!)
 Pokémon: Black & White
 Pokémon: Black & White: Rival Destinies
 Pokémon: Black & White: Adventures in Unova
 Pokémon: Black & White: Adventures in Unova and Beyond
 Pokémon: Diamond and Pearl: Galactic Battles
 Pokémon: Diamond and Pearl: Sinnoh League Victors
 Pokémon: X & Y
 Pokémon XY: Kalos Quest
 Pokémon: XY & Z
 Puppy in My Pocket: Adventures in Pocketville
 Quimbo's Quest (2019–20)
 Random and Whacky (2017–20)
 Redakai: Conquer the Kairu
 Rekkit Rabbit
 Sam Fox: Extreme Adventures (2014–18)
 Sanjay and Craig (2016–19, moved to 10 Shake)
 Scope (2013–20)
 Sherazade: The Untold Stories (2017–20)
 SheZow (moved to ABC ME)
 Sidekick
 Slugterra (moved to ABC ME)
 SpongeBob SquarePants (2012–13, 2020, moved to 10 Shake)
 Teenage Mutant Ninja Turtles (1987 series) (2013–20)
 Teenage Mutant Ninja Turtles (2012 series) (moved to ABC ME)
 Tickety Toc
 Toasted TV (2012–20)
 Totally Spies! (2018–20)
 Totally Wild (2013–20, moved to 10 Shake)
 Transformers Prime
 Transformers: Robots in Disguise (2015 series)
 Treasure Island
 Vic the Viking (2013–17)
 Victorious (2012–17)
 Xiaolin Chronicles
 Yu-Gi-Oh! 5D's

Preschool (2012–20)

 Bernard (2018)
 Blaze and the Monster Machines (2020, moved to 10 Shake)
 Bob the Builder (moved to ABC Kids)
 Butterbean's Café (2020, moved to 10 Shake)
 Care Bears and Cousins
 Care Bears: Welcome to Care-a-Lot
 Crocamole (2016–20, moved to 10 Shake)
 Dinosaur Train (moved to ABC Kids)
 Dora the Explorer (2020, moved to 10 Shake)
 Hi-5 House (2014–2015)
 Littlest Pet Shop (2012) (Now on 9Go!)
 Mia and Me
 PAW Patrol (2020, shared with 9Go!, moved to 10 Shake)
 Pound Puppies (2010 series)
 Strawberry Shortcake's Berry Bitty Adventures
 Transformers: Rescue Bots (2015–16)
 Tree Fu Tom (moved to ABC Kids)
 Wurrawhy (2013–2016)

Comedy

 2 Broke Girls
 1600 Penn
 600 Bottles of Wine (2018)
 Angel from Hell
 Ben and Kate
 The Brady Bunch
 Carol's Second Act
 Caroline in the City
 Cheers
 Clueless
 The Conners
 Crazy Ex-Girlfriend
 The Crazy Ones
 Dads
 Death Valley
 Don't Trust the B---- in Apartment 23
 Enlisted
 Everybody Loves Raymond (moved to 9Go!)
 Family Ties
 Fresh Meat
 Fresh Off the Boat 
 Friends with Better Lives
 Get Smart 
 Glee
 The Goodwin Games
 The Great Indoors
 The Grinder
 Happy Days
 Hogan's Heroes (moved to 10 Bold)
 House of Lies
 How I Met Your Mother (moved to 7flix)
 Jane the Virgin
 Last Man Standing 
 Laverne & Shirley
 The Love Boat (Now on 10 Bold)
 Malcolm in the Middle (moved to 9Go!)
 Micro Nation
 The Millers
 Mork & Mindy
 Mr. & Mrs. Murder
 Murphy Brown
 New Girl (moved to SBS Viceland)
 The New Normal
 The Office (moved to 10 Shake)
 Plonk!
 Raising Hope
 Roseanne
 Rules of Engagement
 Sabrina, the Teenage Witch
 Scream Queens
 Sex and the City
 Stage Mums (2018)
 Sunny Skies
 Taxi
 Two and a Half Men
 Webster
 Wilfred
 Will & Grace
 Wings
 You're the Worst

Drama

 The 4400
 90210
 7th Heaven
 American Horror Story
 Angel
 Being Human
 Beauty & the Beast
 Beverly Hills, 90210
 Buffy the Vampire Slayer
 Californication
 Charmed
 Charmed (2018 TV series)
 Dexter
 Diagnosis Murder (moved to 10 Bold)
 The Division
 Dollhouse
 Dr. Quinn, Medicine Woman
 Emily Owens, M.D.
 Empire
 Eureka
 Extant
 The Flash 
 Friday Night Lights
 The Gates
 The Good Wife
 In Plain Sight
 JAG (Now on 10 Bold)
 Judging Amy (moved to 9Gem)
 Life Unexpected
 London's Burning
 MacGyver (moved to 10 Bold)
 Medium
 Melrose Place
 Merlin
 Murder in the First (2016)
 Neighbours (2011–2022)
 Nurse Jackie
 Reckless
 Reef Doctors
 Ringer
 Rush
 Saving Grace (moved to Channel 10)
 Skins
 Smallville (moved to 7flix)
 Sleepy Hollow
 Stargate Universe
 Star Trek: Deep Space Nine (moved to 10 Bold)
 Star Trek: The Next Generation (moved to 10 Bold)
 Star Trek: Voyager (moved to 10 Bold)
 The Strain
 Supernatural
 This Is Us
 Torchwood
 Touched by an Angel
 Witches of East End

Factual
 Wildlife Warriors

Light entertainment

 Couch Time (2011–17)
 The Great Australian Spelling Bee
 The Late Late Show with Craig Ferguson
 The Late Late Show with James Corden (moved to 10 Shake)
 The Late Show with Stephen Colbert (Now on Channel 10)
 The Loop (2012–20)
 Movie Juice
 The Talk

Game Shows
 Family Feud (Channel 10 simulcast)
 Pointless (Channel 10 simulcast)

Reality

 100% Hotter
 American Idol (moved to FOX8, later Channel 9 and 9Go!)
 America's Next Top Model
 Bondi Ink Tattoo
 Brides of Beverly Hills
 Britain & Ireland's Next Top Model
 The Choice
 Come Date with Me
 Dancing on Ice
 Dating Naked
 Excused
 The Face
 Fashion Star
 Geordie Shore
 The Glee Project
 King of the Nerds
 Mobbed
 Naked Beach
 New Zealand's Next Top Model
 Posh Frock Shop
 Queer Eye for the Straight Guy
 Snog Marry Avoid? (moved to 9Life)
 So You Think You Can Dance US (moved to FOX8)
 Tattoos After Dark
 Young Talent Time (2012 series, encores)

Sport
 Esports Gfinity Elite Series Australia

Religious
 Joyce Meyer: Enjoying Everyday Life (moved to 9Gem)
 Mass for You at Home

Availability
10 Peach is available in 576i standard definition from the network's five metropolitan owned-and-operated stations, TEN Sydney, ATV Melbourne, TVQ Brisbane, ADS Adelaide, and NEW Perth.

The channel is also available to regional Australia viewers through Southern Cross Austereo's owned-and-operated stations SGS/SCN in Spencer Gulf and Broken Hill, GLV/BCV in Regional Victoria, CTC in Southern New South Wales/Australian Capital Territory, TNQ in Regional Queensland, and WIN Television through its owned-and-operated stations NRN in Northern New South Wales and MGS/LRS in eastern South Australia, and MDN in Griffith and the MIA. Digital joint venture stations WDT in regional Western Australia, MDV in Mildura, TDT in Tasmania, DTD in Darwin, and CDT in Remote Central & Eastern Australia also carry 10 Peach.

Logo and identity history

Identity history
11 January 2011 – 31 October 2018: He11o
31 October 2018 – present: Life's Peachy

Notes

References

External links

Network 10
Digital terrestrial television in Australia
English-language television stations in Australia
Television channels and stations established in 2011
2011 establishments in Australia